Alles was zählt ("All That Matters") is a German television soap opera first broadcast on RTL on 4 September 2006.

Plot 
The original plot revolved around Diana Sommer's dream to become a world class ice skater. She fell in love with Julian Herzog, who signed her at the prestigious Steinkamp Sport and Wellness Center, run by the unscrupulous Steinkamp dynasty. Diana and Julian eventually became a couple, but in November 2007, Julian suffered a brain hemorrhage and died during their wedding. Diana remained in Essen until January 2009, when she left to join a skating centre in Halle. The story continues to revolve around the Steinkamp Sport and Wellness Centre and its quest to become a sporting powerhouse, as well as the lives of the characters who work at and around the Centre.

Backstage Information
AWZ is the third daily soap on RTL, created after Gute Zeiten, schlechte Zeiten and Unter uns. While the show is set in Essen, filming takes place in Cologne.

Tanja Szewczenko is — like Diana, the character she played — a famous German ice skater. In January 2009, she left the series to pursue her skating career.

In February 2008, AWZ was awarded Blu Magazine's Best National TV Format award for its portrayal of the relationship between Deniz and Roman. Actors Igor Dolgatschew and Dennis Grabosch accepted the award on behalf of the series. While their story was spotlighted, the "DeRo" storyline reached a wide international fanbase with over 12,000 subscribers on YouTube.

The series is produced by Grundy UFA productions, the same company responsible for RTL's other daily soaps. In October 2007, this show and Unter uns were part of the first-ever crossover of two soap operas in Germany, when characters from AWZ (Vanessa, Nina, and Tim) attended a concert by Mars from Unter uns (episode 289); Mars later performed an impromptu concert at the No. 7 (episode 296). In April 2010, another RTL crossover featured Helmut Orosz and Mehrzad Marashi from DSDS performing a duet in the No. 7 (episode 904).

The theme song, "Nie genug", is sung by Austrian singer Christina Stürmer; she returned with her band to perform two numbers for Ben and Isabelle's wedding, "Warum" (episode 1000) and "Juniherz" (episode 1001).

Cast

Current main cast

Former main cast

Directors 
AWZ is directed in week-long blocks with revolving directors, including Christof Brehmer, Stefan Bühling, Gudrun Scherer, Jörg Mielich, Tina Kriwitz, Klaus Knoesel, Annette Herre, Matthias Paul and Andreas Stenschke, to name just a very few.

Broadcast

External links 
 Official site
 Grundy UFA – Production company
 Magic Media Company (MMC) – Production sites

References 

German television soap operas
2006 German television series debuts
2000s German television series
2010s German television series
2020s German television series
German LGBT-related television shows
German-language television shows
RTL (German TV channel) original programming